Courtney Lynn McCool-Griffeth (born April 1, 1988) is an American former artistic gymnast who competed in the 2004 Summer Olympics. She was coached by Al and Armine Fong of Great American Gymnastic Express.

From 2007–2010, McCool competed for the University of Georgia. In that time, the team won three NCAA national titles. She is currently an assistant coach and choreographer for the LSU Tigers team.

Elite gymnastics career 
McCool was the runner-up in the junior division of the 2003 National Championships and won a silver medal on vault at the 2003 Pan American Games. The following year, her first as a senior international elite, she was the runner-up at the American Cup and the all-around champion at the Olympic Test Event in Athens. She was the only gymnast at the Test Event to qualify for all four event finals, and she won a silver medal on vault and bronze on the uneven bars. She then placed fourth in the all-around at the National Championships and second at the Olympic Trials, earning a spot on the Olympic team.

At the Olympics, McCool competed all four events in the qualification round, but faltered on beam and floor and was excluded from the team finals lineup. The United States team won the silver medal behind Romania.

After the Olympics, McCool joined the T.J. Maxx Tour of Olympic Champions, a nationwide gymnastics exhibition tour. However, after finding out that the tour would not be stopping in her hometown, Kansas City, she joined the Rock 'N Roll Gymnastics Challenge, a rival tour, for its Kansas City show. T.J. Maxx officials said they had not given McCool permission to do so, and dropped her from the rest of the tour.

Late in 2004, it emerged that McCool had been suffering from Kienbock's disease, a wrist condition that required surgery and prevented her from performing in further post-Olympic exhibitions.

NCAA career 
McCool earned a full scholarship to the University of Georgia beginning in the 2006–07 school year. In her freshman season, she helped the team win its third straight national title, scoring an event high of 9.95 on beam at the 2007 NCAA Women's Gymnastics Championships in Salt Lake City. At the 2008 Championships in Athens, Georgia, McCool won the floor exercise and contributed to Georgia's fourth consecutive title. In 2009, Georgia won a fifth straight title, and McCool was named an All-American on balance beam, where she scored her first 10.0.

Skills 
McCool performed the following routines in 2004:

Vault (Start Value: 9.7): 1½-twisting Yurchenko

Uneven bars (SV: 9.9): Kip, cast handstand (KCH); stalder shoot to high bar; KCH; underswing to blind turn + Khorkina; KCH; Gienger; KCH 1/2 + giant 3/2 (Dawes) + Tkatchev; KCH; giant 1/1 + shootover to handstand + underswing shoot to high bar; KCH; giant + giant + double layout dismount.

Balance beam (SV: 10.0): Front handspring mount (McCool); front aerial + back handspring stepout + layout stepout + layout stepout; switch leap + Onodi; sheep jump; wolf jump 1/1; switch side leap; full turn with leg above horizontal + Popa; roundoff + triple twist dismount.

Floor exercise (SV: 10.0): Popa + tuck jump 2/1; roundoff + back handspring + 2½ twist + front 1/1; double turn with leg above horizontal + wolf jump 1/1; switch ring leap + Gogean; triple full; front double twist + front layout.

McCool's balance beam mount, a front handspring with a two-foot landing, is named after her in the International Federation of Gymnastics' Code of Points because she was the first to perform it at the Olympics.

Floor music
2004: "Peter Gunn Theme"

References

External links
 
 
 
 Gym Dogs Win Third Straight NCAA Championship … article with videos
 A Site by Morgan dedicated to Courtney McCool...great info, photo galleries, videos, animations, and more.
 Dragon Gymnastics official website
 Courtney McCool videos on Gymnastike.org

1988 births
Living people
Sportspeople from Kansas City, Missouri
American female artistic gymnasts
Gymnasts at the 2003 Pan American Games
Gymnasts at the 2004 Summer Olympics
Georgia Gym Dogs gymnasts
Olympic silver medalists for the United States in gymnastics
Medalists at the 2004 Summer Olympics
Pan American Games gold medalists for the United States
Pan American Games medalists in gymnastics
U.S. women's national team gymnasts
Medalists at the 2003 Pan American Games
NCAA gymnasts who have scored a perfect 10